Diyarbakır Airport  is a military airbase and public airport located in Diyarbakır, Turkey.

Overview
Diyarbakır Airport is home to the 8th Air Wing (Ana Jet Üs or AJÜ) of the 2nd Air Force Command (Hava Kuvvet Komutanligi) of the Turkish Air Force (Türk Hava Kuvvetleri). Other wings of this command are located in Merzifon (LTAP), Malatya Erhaç (LTAT) and İncirlik (LTAG).

The airport was closed for renovation from 1 June to 1 September 2012. All air traffic was diverted to Batman, Mardin and Elazığ.

In 2012, an Armenian American named Zuart Sudjian, claiming that she held the land deed to the property of the airport and owned the right of its inheritance. She filed a lawsuit through her lawyer Ali Elbeyoğlu for the return of the lands. After a rejection by a local court, the case was taken to the Court of Cassation where the verdict is being appealed.

Airlines and destinations
The following airlines operate regular scheduled and charter flights at Diyarbakır  Airport:

Traffic Statistics 

(*)Source: DHMI.gov.tr

Incidents 
On January 8, 2003, Turkish Airlines Flight 634, crashed on approaching Diyarbakır Airport. 75 of the 80 passengers and crew on board were killed.

On August 27, 2016, several rockets were fired at the airport.

References

External links

Airports in Turkey
Turkish Air Force bases
Buildings and structures in Diyarbakır Province
Transport in Diyarbakır Province